The Human Dutch is a 1963 Dutch documentary film directed by Bert Haanstra, about the daily lives of people in the Netherlands. It was a big success in the Netherlands with almost 1.7 million admissions, the third most successful Dutch film at the time. It was nominated for an Academy Award for Best Documentary Feature. It was also selected as the Dutch entry for the Best Foreign Language Film at the 37th Academy Awards, but was not accepted as a nominee.

Cast
 Simon Carmiggelt - Narrator (Dutch version) (voice)
 Peter Ustinov - Narrator (English version) (voice)

See also
 List of submissions to the 37th Academy Awards for Best Foreign Language Film
 List of Dutch submissions for the Academy Award for Best Foreign Language Film

References

External links

, posted by the Netherlands Institute for Sound and Vision

1963 films
1963 documentary films
1960s Dutch-language films
Dutch documentary films
Films directed by Bert Haanstra
Documentary films about the Netherlands